Myisha Hines-Allen (born May 30, 1996) is an American professional basketball player for the Washington Mystics of the Women's National Basketball Association (WNBA). In college she played for the University of Louisville.

Growing up in Montclair, New Jersey, Hines-Allen was a fan of the WNBA, particularly the New York Liberty. She attended Montclair High School. Her younger brother, Josh Allen, is a defensive end for the Jacksonville Jaguars.

Louisville statistics 

Source

WNBA career statistics

Regular season

|-
| style='text-align:left;'|2018
| style='text-align:left;'|Washington
| 24 || 1 || 10.5 || .450 || .333 || .654 || 2.9 || 0.4 || 0.4 || 0.2 || 0.4 || 3.8
|-
| style="text-align:left;background:#afe6ba;" | 2019†
| style='text-align:left;'|Washington
| 27 || 0 || 7.8 || .362 || .375 || .583 || 2.1 || 0.9 || 0.3 || 0.4 || 0.8 || 2.3
|-
| style='text-align:left;'|2020
| style='text-align:left;'|Washington
| 22 || 22 || 30.0 || .510 || .426 || .828 || 8.9 || 2.6 || 1.4 || 0.2 || 2.2 || 17.0
|-
| style='text-align:left;'|2021
| style='text-align:left;'|Washington
| 18 || 17 || 25.7 || .414 || .317 || .732 || 7.0 || 2.5 || 1.3 || 0.6 || 1.8 || 12.9
|-
| style='text-align:left;'|2022
| style='text-align:left;'|Washington
| 34 || 15 || 19.3 || .415 || .367 || .703 || 5.3 || 1.9 || 0.8 || 0.3 || 1.7 || 8.9
|-
| style='text-align:left;'| Career
| style='text-align:left;'| 5 years, 1 team
| 125 || 55 || 17.9 || .444 || .375 || .731 || 5.0 || 1.6 || 0.8 || 0.3 || 1.3 || 8.5

Postseason

|-
| align="left" | 2018
| align="left" | Washington
| 6 || 0 || 11.3 || .833 || 1.000 || .000 || 2.7 || 0.5 || 0.2 || 0.0 || 0.0 || 5.2
|-
| style="text-align:left;background:#afe6ba;" | 2019†
| align="left" | Washington
| 1 || 0 || 3.0 || .000 || .000 || .000 || 1.0 || 2.0 || 0.0 || 1.0 || 0.0 || 0.0
|-
| align="left" | 2020
| align="left" | Washington
| 1 || 1 || 27.0 || .667 || 1.000 || 1.000 || 9.0 || 1.0 || 0.0 || 2.0 || 3.0 || 11.0
|-
| align="left" | 2022
| align="left" | Washington
| 2 || 0 || 14.5 || .182 || .000 || 1.000 || 3.5 || 2.0 || 1.0 || 0.0 || 1.0 || 5.0
|-
| align="left" | Career
| align="left" | 4 years, 1 team
| 10 || 1 || 12.7 || .583 || .500 || 1.000 || 3.3 || 1.0 || 0.3 || 0.3 || 0.5 || 5.2
|}

References

External links
Career information and statistics from Basketball-Reference.com and WNBA Player Profile
Louisville Cardinals bio

1996 births
Living people
All-American college women's basketball players
American women's basketball players
Basketball players from New Jersey
Louisville Cardinals women's basketball players
Montclair High School (New Jersey) alumni
People from Montclair, New Jersey
Small forwards
Sportspeople from Essex County, New Jersey
Washington Mystics draft picks
Washington Mystics players